Iha (Kapaur) is a Papuan language spoken on the tip of the Bomberai Peninsula. It is the basis of a pidgin used as the local trade language.

Phonology 

 /i a/ can also have allophones [ɪ ə].

Pronouns
Flassy and Animung (1992) list the following pronouns for Iha.

References

Languages of western New Guinea
West Bomberai languages